Reynaldo Valentin (born February 3, 1979) is an American actor. He is best known for his roles in  Generation Kill as Cpl. Gabe Garza, One Tree Hill as Nicholas "Nick" Chavez and in The Bedford Diaries as Chris Hernandez.

Valentin has appeared in the following films: Kill the Dog (2006), American Identity (2007) and Crossing Over (2008).

Filmography

Film

Television

External links 
 
 Rey Valentin's Official Site

Living people
1979 births